Groves may refer to:


Places
 The Groves, an area of York, England
 Groves, Texas, U.S., a city
 Groves High School (disambiguation), several schools
 Groves Stadium, home of BB&T Field, an American football venue in Winston-Salem, North Carolina

Ships
 USS Groves (DE-543), a U.S. Navy destroyer escort cancelled during construction in 1944
 USS Stephen W. Groves (FFG-29), a U.S. Navy guided-missile frigate in commission since 1982

Other uses
 The Groves family, a prominent British theatre family dating back to the Regency era.
 Groves (surname), including a list of people with the surname
 Grove's Dictionary of Music and Musicians, an earlier version of The New Grove Dictionary of Music and Musicians

See also
 
 :Category:Sacred groves, various places considered sacred groves
 Grove (disambiguation)
 Graves (disambiguation)

ru:Гровс